The Agunah is a 1974 English translation by Curt Leviant of the 1961 Yiddish novel Di Agune (די עגונה) by Chaim Grade.  It was also published in a 1962 Hebrew translation, Ha-Agunah (העגונה).

The novel is set in the Jewish part of Vilna, Lithuania, around 1930.  It concerns a woman whose husband was missing in action during the First World War, and who was thus an agunah, a woman who could not remarry according to Jewish law.  The woman in the novel is not interested in remarrying, but eventually, between pressure from her family and to escape an obnoxious suitor, she accepts the marriage proposal of a minor acquaintance.  They find a maverick rabbi who is willing to grant permission, and the two marry in secret and move to a part of Vilna where nobody knows them.  But the secret comes out, and the resulting controversy, fanned by the obnoxious suitor, sends the community into a tumult.

Reception

{{quote
|It is wry yet alarming insight into what happens when a community is divided over religion and religious interpretation.
|Hilary Daninhirsch
|The Jewish Chronicle (Pittsburgh)}}

References

External links
Leviant on Grade Jewish ActionLeviant on Grade Jewish Review of Books''

1961 American novels
Agunot
Jewish American novels
Jews and Judaism in Vilnius
Novels about rabbis
Novels set in Lithuania
Vilnius in fiction
Yiddish-language literature
Yiddish culture in Lithuania